Sterictiphora is a Holarctic genus of sawflies belonging to the family Argidae.

Selected species
Sterictiphora angelicae (Panzer, 1799)
Sterictiphora cruenta Smith, 1969
Sterictiphora denticula Koch, 1988
Sterictiphora furcata (Villers, 1789)
Sterictiphora gastrica (Klug, 1814)
Sterictiphora geminata (Gmelin, 1790)
Sterictiphora hannemanni Koch, 1988
Sterictiphora koreana Lee & Wei, 2016
Sterictiphora longicornis Chevin, 1982
Sterictiphora maura (Cresson, 1880)
Sterictiphora notensis Togashi, 1968
Sterictiphora procera Koch, 1988
Sterictiphora prunivorus (Dyar, 1897)
Sterictiphora rugosa Lee & Wei, 2016
Sterictiphora sericeus (Norton, 1867)
Sterictiphora serotina Smith, 1969
Sterictiphora sorbi Kontuniemi, 1966
Sterictiphora tanoi Togashi, 1997
Sterictiphora transversa Smith, 1969

References

Argidae
Sawfly genera